Heart of an Actress (French: Âme d'artiste) is a 1924 French silent drama film directed by Germaine Dulac and starring Iván Petrovich, Nicolas Koline and Mabel Poulton. Poulton had almost been cast in Abel Gance's Napoleon, but after being turned down she appeared in this film before returning to Britain.

Cast
 Iván Petrovich as Herbert Campbell, le poète  
 Nicolas Koline as Le souffleur Morris, père adoptif d'Helen  
 Mabel Poulton as Helen Taylor  
 Yvette Andréyor as Mrs. Campbell, femme du poète  
 Henry Houry as Lord Stamford 
 Jeanne Bérangère as La belle-mère 
 Félix Barre as Vendeur  
 Gina Manès as L'Actrice 
 Charles Vanel   
 Lou Davy   
 Ève Francis  
 Gaston Modot

References

Bibliography
 Macnab, Geoffrey. Searching for Stars. Cassell, 2000.

External links 
 

1924 films
French drama films
French silent feature films
1924 drama films
1920s French-language films
Films directed by Germaine Dulac
French black-and-white films
Pathé films
Silent drama films
1920s French films